Ruler X, as a designation sometimes used by Mayanists to refer to a personage whose name has not otherwise been deciphered, may refer to:
 Ruler X (Rio Azul), ruler associated with Tomb 1 at Rio Azul, born 417 CE
 Ruler X (Toniná), ruled at Toniná, ca. 514 CE  
 K'inich Toob'il Yopaat, ruler at Caracol reigning sometime between 810 and 830 CE, known as Ruler X prior to proposed decipherment of name glyph